The BSA S-Series of motorcycles, most commonly known as the BSA Sloper, were a series of motorcycles produced by the Birmingham Small Arms Company (BSA) from 1927 to 1935.

Launched in 1927, the 493cc overhead valve engine was slanted, and the motorcycle featured a saddle tank that enabled a low seating position, improving the centre of gravity and handling. Designated as the new S-series, whether this stood for sloper, speed or silence is unknown, but sloper became the term used by motorcyclists and hence adopted by BSA for marketing. The Sloper range remained much the same until its demise in 1935. Each model was designated with the two letters of the year produced, hence the S31 was produced in 1931.

The first models featured a 493cc (80x98mm) single ported cylinder-head, topped by a cast-aluminium enclosure for the rockers, with exposed valve springs. Alongside the cast barrel were plated tubes to cover the pushrods. Easy cam contours and wide bases on the tappets ensured no associated valve clack, meaning that the Sloper was regarded by many as one of the smoothest and quietest of sporting 500cc machines. The large crankcase accommodated both a large and heavy flywheel, and a separate oil feed tank controlled by a hand meter.

Early models had a duplex-frame and three-speed gearbox, but soon the top tube was replaced by an I-frame forging to support a new steering head. By the 1929/30 the engine carried a twin-port head, and the ohv joined by a less-popular side-valve model; these models also had extra chrome. From 1932 all were equipped by a 4-speed gearbox. From 1930 there was an optional sporting kit for £10, including a high-compression piston, hardened valves and springs, and a racing sparkplug, but the company noted that there were few buyers. The model ceased production in 1935, by which time there were only two models, an overhead-valve and a sidevalve, both of 595cc.

The large heavy flywheel and easy cams gave the Sloper a slow purposeful tick over, which was supplemented by large fishtail silencers. With a purposeful rhythm, together with its easy handling, they may have added to choice of its name.

See also
List of motorcycles of the 1920s

References

Sloper
Standard motorcycles
Motorcycles introduced in the 1920s